Gregoria Apaza (June 23, 1751– September 5, 1782), was an indigenous leader in Bolivia. In 1781, she participated with her brother Julian Apaza (Tupac Katari) and sister-in-law Bartolina Sisa in a major indigenous revolt against Spanish colonial rule in Bolivia. These Aymara leaders laid siege to the cities of La Paz and Sorata before being defeated and executed.

References

"Indians of Latin America", accessed July 14, 2006 
"The International day of Indigenous Woman" accessed July 16, 2006 
 del Valle de Siles, María Eugenia (1981). Bartolina Sisa y Gregoria Apaza: dos heroínas indígenas. Biblioteca Popular Boliviana de "Última Hora". p. 73.

1751 births
1782 deaths
Bolivian people of Aymara descent
18th-century Bolivian people
Indigenous leaders of the Americas
Bolivian rebels
Indigenous rebellions against the Spanish Empire
Women in 18th-century warfare
Women in war in South America